Wyss is an Alemannic form of the German surname Weiß used predominantly in Switzerland. It comes from Middle High German  wīz (white, blonde) and Old High German  wîs (wise, clever, experienced, knows).

Notable persons with the surname include:

 Amanda Wyss (born 1960), American actress
 Amy Wyss (born 1970/1971), Swiss-American billionaire businesswoman and philanthropist.
 Andre Wyss (contemporary), American professor of paleontology
  (1852–1900), German historian and archivist
  (1833–1890), Swiss writer
  (1905–1986), Swiss philologist
 Danilo Wyss (born 1985), Swiss road racing bicyclist
  (1763–1839), Swiss politician
 David Wyss, American economist
 Denise Wyss (born 1965), first priestess of the Christian Catholic Church of Switzerland
  (1923–1994), German anthropologist and professor in Würzburg
 Dorothea Wyss (born around 1430/32, died after 1487) married Niklaus von Flüe, the patron saint of Switzerland
  (born 1952), Swiss politician (CVP)
 Franz Anatol Wyss (born 1940), Swiss painter
 Georg von Wyss (1816–1893), Swiss historian
 Hansjörg Wyss (contemporary), Swiss billionaire
 Johann David Wyss (1743–1818), Swiss author of The Swiss Family Robinson
  (1782–1837), Swiss painter and draftsman
 Johann Rudolf Wyss (1782–1830), Swiss author and folklorist; son of Johann David
  (1763–1845), Swiss country priest and poet
  (1913–2002), Swiss journalist and writer
 Marcel Wyss (born 1986), Swiss road cyclist
  (1908–1977), Swiss journalist and photographer
  (born 1959), Swiss Swiss Roman Catholic "priestess" (not officially recognized)
 Orville Wyss (1912–1993), American microbiologist
 Paul Wyss (born 1928), Swiss politician and former ice hockey player
  (1844–1888), Swiss jurist and legal scholar
  (1932–2007), Swiss musician and composer
 Sophie Wyss (1897–1983), Swiss soprano
 Thomas Wyss (born 1966), Swiss professional football player
 Ursula Wyss (born 1973), Swiss economist and politician
  (born 1945), Swiss writer
  (born 1965), Swiss communication scientists

Patrician families:

See also
 Escher Wyss (Zürich), quarter of Zürich, Switzerland
 Escher Wyss & Cie., former engineering company in Switzerland
 Wyss Institute for Biologically Inspired Engineering, in the United States
 Wyss Center for Bio and Neuroengineering, in Switzerland
 , Swiss horticultural company
 WYSS, a radio station in Sault Sainte Marie, Michigan

Notes

Swiss-German surnames